Różanka  is a village in the administrative district of Gmina Włodawa, within Włodawa County, Lublin Voivodeship, in eastern Poland, close to the border with Belarus.

The village has a population of 983.

References

Villages in Włodawa County